Tamsica is a genus of moths of the family Crambidae.

Species

References
Natural History Museum Lepidoptera genus database

Diptychophorini
Endemic moths of Hawaii
Crambidae genera
Taxa named by Elwood Zimmerman